Josef Hafner (22 May 1799, Enns10 April 1891, Linz) was an Austrian painter and color lithographer.

Life and work 
His father was the administrator of the prison at the old monastery in Baumgartenberg. In 1811, the prison was moved to Linz Castle and his family followed. There, he began to take drawing lessons at the elementary school. When he was old enough, his father allowed him to attend the Academy of Fine Arts in Vienna, where he won several awards.

After returning to Linz in 1827, he set up the first lithographic institute there. At first, he found it necessary to give private drawing lessons to maintain the institute, but it was eventually successful and would remain in business for thirty-six years, until photography became more popular. 

He created over 180 views of Upper Austria, Salzburg, and Styria, as well as 200 of Linz; including panoramas, maps and portraits. In 1841, he received a special award for a map of the Diocese of Linz.

He was also an avid collector of watches. His collection was acquired by the State Museums in 1905.

Sources 
 
 Eduard Straßmayr: "Josef Hafner (Lebensbilder aus Oberösterreich)", In: Heimatland (Upper Austria), June 1959
 Else Giordani: Die Linzer Hafner-Offizin. Josef Hafner und seine lithographische Anstalt, Kulturverwaltung der Stadt Linz. 1962, pg.276

External links 

 

1799 births
1891 deaths
German lithographers
German watercolourists
Academy of Fine Arts Vienna alumni
People from Upper Austria